Kuteh Kumeh (also Romanized as ‘’’Kūteh Kūmeh’’’) is a village in the suburbs of Lavandevil District, Astara County, Gilan Province, Iran. At the 2006 census, its population was 906, in 220 families. The language of the residents of this region which are mostly Sunni Muslims (Shafi‘i denomination) is Taleshi. The village is located 9 kilometers from Lavandevil. The most attractive points of interest of Kuteh Kumeh are Latun (Barzov) waterfall and Gamo hot water spring.

Language 
Linguistic composition of the village.

References 

Populated places in Astara County

Talysh settlements in Gilan Province